Akishin is a rural locality (a khutor) in Dyakonovskoye Rural Settlement, Uryupinsky District, Volgograd Oblast, Russia. The population was 182 as of 2010. There are 3 streets.

Geography 
Akishin is located in forest steppe, 10 km southeast of Uryupinsk (the district's administrative centre) by road. Dyakonovsky 2-y is the nearest rural locality.

References 

Rural localities in Uryupinsky District